"Shut Up, Make Love" is a song by American rock band Poison. Released in 2000, it was the first single presented to radio stations from their 2000 album, Crack a Smile...and More!.

Release
The song also appears on the second promo single "Be the One" as a B-side. The song was the first Poison single with lead guitarist Blues Saraceno.

Track listing
 Shut Up, Make Love - Rock Radio Edit 3:17 
 Shut Up, Make Love - Lip Smackin' Rap-A-Tappin' 3:53
 Shut Up, Make Love - Call Out Edit 0:11

References

2000 singles
Poison (American band) songs
1995 songs
Songs written by Bret Michaels
Capitol Records singles
Songs written by Rikki Rockett
Songs written by Bobby Dall